Little Taiwan is a wave-cut platform in Cimei Township, Penghu County, Taiwan.

Visible at low tide, the platform has the shape of Taiwan.  Together with the Double-Heart of Stacked Stones it is a tourist attraction on the island of Cimei.

See also
 List of tourist attractions in Taiwan

References 

Landforms of Penghu County
Tourist attractions in Penghu County